Old Town in Gdańsk is the oldest part of the city, located in the northern part of the Śródmieście district (city center).

The Old Town borders with the districts of Aniołki and Młyniska in the north, and with other parts of the Śródmieście: the Sienna Grobla in the east, the Main City, Ołowianka Island and Nowe Ogrody in the south, and Grodzisko in the west.

Sights
Notable structures include:
 Gdańsk Mills
 Old Town Hall
 St. Catherine's Church
 Gdańsk Główny railway station, the main station of Gdańsk
 Monument of King John III Sobieski
 Polish Post Office and Monument of the Defenders of the Polish Post Office
 Mannerist Preachers' House
 Mannerist House of the Abbots of Pelplin
 Monument of Jan Heweliusz
 Monument to the Fallen Shipyard Workers of 1970
 Gdańsk Library of Polish Academy of Sciences
 several old buildings, including houses (kamienice), granaries and churches

Museums
 Museum of the Polish Post (Muzeum Poczty Polskiej)
 Museum of Tower Clocks (Muzeum Zegarów Wieżowych)
 Museum of the Second World War

Gallery

Old Town
Gdańsk